San Paolo Island, named after Saint Paul, is a small island near Taranto, part of the Cheradi Islands.

See also
 List of islands of Italy

Islands of Apulia